Castanopsis densinervia is a tree in the family Fagaceae. The specific epithet  is from the Latin meaning "dense nerves", referring to the leaf venation.

Description
The greyish bark is smooth.

Distribution and habitat
Castanopsis densinervia is endemic to Borneo.

References

densinervia
Endemic flora of Borneo
Trees of Borneo
Plants described in 1968
Flora of the Borneo montane rain forests